The 2016 World RX of Canada was the seventh round of the third season of the FIA World Rallycross Championship. The event was held at the Circuit Trois-Rivières in Trois-Rivières, Quebec.

Heats

Semi-finals
Semi-Final 1

Semi-Final 2

Final

Standings after the event

References

External links

|- style="text-align:center"
|width="35%"|Previous race:2016 World RX of Sweden
|width="40%"|FIA World Rallycross Championship2016 season
|width="35%"|Next race:2016 World RX of France
|- style="text-align:center"
|width="35%"|Previous race:2015 World RX of Canada
|width="40%"|World RX of Canada
|width="35%"|Next race:2017 World RX of Canada
|- style="text-align:center"

Canada
2016 in Canadian motorsport
August 2016 sports events in Canada